The Interborough Express (IBX) is a proposed 14-mile (22.5 km) light rail line in New York City. As proposed, the line would use the existing right-of-way from the Bay Ridge Branch and Fremont Secondary to connect Bay Ridge, Brooklyn and Jackson Heights, Queens, but operate on its own separate tracks. Near the All Faiths Cemetery in Queens, IBX would operate on the street.

History
In mid-October 2019, the MTA announced that it would study the feasibility of restoring passenger service on the Bay Ridge Branch portion of the route. On January 23, 2020, the MTA Board awarded a $1.3 million contract to study the feasibility of restoring passenger service to this section to AECOM. In November 2021, Acting MTA Chairman and CEO Janno Lieber said that money from Infrastructure Investment and Jobs Act could be used to fund the completion of the Bay Ridge Branch project.

In early January 2022, as part of her State of the State address New York governor Kathy Hochul announced that the state would move forward with the Bay Ridge Branch Line by conducting an environmental study on the IBX. The study would consider whether the line should be heavy rail (rapid transit or regional rail), light rail, or bus rapid transit. End-to-end travel times are expected to be 40 minutes, and weekday ridership is initially projected to be 74,000 to 88,000. The route would connect up to 17 subway lines and the Long Island Rail Road. A feasibility study was also completed on January 20, 2022.
Governor Hochul also announced that she had directed the Port Authority of New York and New Jersey to complete an environmental review for the Cross-Harbor Rail Tunnel for freight. Hochul announced in her January 2023 address that the project would proceed as a light rail corridor. Reasons for the light rail choice include faster service, easier construction—mostly fitting in existing right of way with a short on street segment, availability of off-the-shelf rolling stock and a lower overall cost, estimated at $5.5 billion, or about $48,000 per expected daily rider. Proposed headway would be 5 minutes peak and 10 minutes at other times. Freight use would continue, requiring separated tracks.

Preliminary stations
As of 2023, the preliminary stations are: Brooklyn Army Terminal, 4th Avenue, Eighth Avenue, New Utrecht Avenue, McDonald Avenue, East 16th Street, Flatbush Avenue-Nostrand Avenue, Utica Avenue, Remsen Avenue, Linden Boulevard, Livonia Avenue, Sutter Avenue, Atlantic Avenue, Wilson Avenue, Myrtle Avenue, Metropolitan Avenue, Eliot Avenue, Grand Avenue, and Roosevelt Avenue.

References 

Proposed railway lines in New York (state)
Proposed public transportation in New York (state)